Jocelynne Annette Scutt AO (born 8 June 1947) is an Australian feminist lawyer, writer and commentator. She is one of Australia's leading human rights barristers, was instrumental in reform of the laws on rape and domestic violence, and has served as Anti-Discrimination Commissioner of Tasmania and as a judge on the High Court of Fiji.

Career
Jocelynne Scutt was born in Perth, Western Australia. She graduated in law from the University of Western Australia in 1969 and undertook postgraduate studies in law at the University of Sydney, at both Southern Methodist University and the University of Michigan in the United States, and Cambridge University in England.

Scutt has worked with the Australian Institute of Criminology and as director of research with the Legal and Constitutional Committee of the parliament of Victoria. From 1981 to 1982 she worked at the Sydney Bar and then was Deputy Chairperson of the Law Reform Commission, Victoria. In 1986 she returned to private practice in Melbourne. She served as the first Anti-Discrimination Commissioner of Tasmania from 1999 to 2004. In 2007 she accepted a judicial post on the Fiji High Court.

She is a member of the UN Committee Against Trafficking, a board member of the International Alliance of Women and its representative to the Coalition for the International Criminal Court.

A member of both the British Labour Party and Australian Labor Party, Scutt was elected to represent the division of Arbury on the Cambridgeshire County Council on 2 May 2013 and reelected on 4 May 2017.

Scutt was called to the English Bar in July 2014.
She became a part of Electoral Lobby in Canberra as well as Sydney. She also established the publisher, Artemis.

Selected works

Honours

 She was appointed an Officer of the Order of Australia in 1996, "for service to feminist jurisprudence and issues affecting women, including the establishment of a publishing company encouraging female contributions".
 She was inducted into the Victorian Honour Roll of Women in 2001.

References

External links
 Interview with Jocelynne Scutt, vicnet.net.au; accessed 29 September 2015.
 Biography of Dr Jocelynne Scutt, Australian Centre for Leadership for Women; accessed 31 May 2017.
 

1947 births
Living people
Australian barristers
Australian judges on the courts of Fiji
Australian feminists
Writers from Perth, Western Australia
Australian feminist writers
Australian human rights activists
Women human rights activists
University of Michigan alumni
Officers of the Order of Australia
Members of Cambridgeshire County Council
21st-century British women politicians
21st-century English women politicians
21st-century English politicians
21st-century Australian women politicians
21st-century Australian politicians
Women councillors in England